Atheel al-Nujaifi (born 1958) is an Iraqi politician who was the Governor of Nineveh Governorate from April 2009 until May 2015.

Nujaifi was born into a Mawsili family in 1958. He is a brother of the Vice-President of Iraq, Osama al-Nujaifi. His ancestors were closely aligned with the Ottoman rulers of Mosul, resulting in them receiving huge grants of land in al-Hamdaniya district. Nujaifi has degrees in Engineering and Law from the University of Mosul.

References

External links
 Official website

Governors of Nineveh Governorate
Iraqi politicians
Living people
People from Mosul
1958 births
University of Mosul alumni